The Victory Ground is a cricket ground in Bury St Edmunds, Suffolk, England.  The ground was established in 1935, when Suffolk played the Surrey Second XI in the ground's first Minor Counties Championship match.  From 1935 to the present day, it has hosted 50 Minor Counties matches.

The first List-A match played on the ground came in the 1981 NatWest Trophy between Suffolk and Derbyshire. From 1981 to 2005, the ground hosted ten List-A matches, the last of which saw Suffolk play Glamorgan in the 2005 Cheltenham & Gloucester Trophy.

In local domestic cricket, the Victory Ground is the home of Bury St Edmunds Cricket Club who play in the East Anglian Premier Cricket League.

References

External links
Victory Ground on CricketArchive
Victory Ground on Cricinfo

Cricket grounds in Suffolk
Bury St Edmunds
Suffolk County Cricket Club
Sports venues completed in 1935